Roberto Lago Soto (born 30 August 1985) is a Spanish former professional footballer who played as a left-back.

He spent the better part of his career with Celta and Getafe, totalling 159 games in the Segunda División (six goals) and 86 in La Liga. In 2016, he signed with Cypriot club APOEL.

Club career

Celta
Born in Vigo, Galicia, Lago was a product of hometown RC Celta de Vigo's youth system. He made his debut with the first team in the 2007–08 season, playing 33 matches for a Segunda División side which eventually finished 17th one year after being relegated. In the following years he was an undisputed starter when available, contributing 35 games and one goal in the 2011–12 campaign as the club returned to La Liga.

Lago's maiden appearance in the top flight was on 18 August 2012, starting in a 0–1 home loss against Málaga CF. He only missed four fixtures during the season, as Celta eventually stayed up at the expense of neighbouring Deportivo de La Coruña.

Getafe
Lago joined fellow top-tier club Getafe CF on 12 June 2013, signing a four-year deal. In his three-year spell at the Coliseum Alfonso Pérez, often marred by injury, he appeared in 58 competitive matches.

In July 2016, following the team's top-tier relegation, Lago left by triggering a release clause in his contract.

APOEL
On 9 July 2016, at nearly 31, Lago moved abroad for the first time in his career, penning a two-year contract with reigning Cypriot champions APOEL FC. He made his official debut on 10 September, playing the full 90 minutes in a 4–0 away victory over Nea Salamis Famagusta FC in the First Division.

Career statistics

Honours
APOEL
Cypriot First Division: 2016–17, 2017–18

References

External links

Celta de Vigo biography 

1985 births
Living people
Spanish footballers
Footballers from Vigo
Association football defenders
La Liga players
Segunda División players
Segunda División B players
Celta de Vigo B players
RC Celta de Vigo players
Getafe CF footballers
Cypriot First Division players
APOEL FC players
Spanish expatriate footballers
Expatriate footballers in Cyprus
Spanish expatriate sportspeople in Cyprus